Alex Pereira Soares (born February 1, 1982) known as Alex, is a Brazilian footballer who last played as a forward for Walking Boyz Company in the SVB Hoofdklasse. He finished the 2006–07 season as the league's top scorer while playing for SV Jai Hanuman.

Career 
Born in Belém, Brazil, Alex moved to Paramaribo, Suriname joining SV Jai Hanuman competing in the SVB Eerste Klasse, the 2nd tier of football in Suriname. Helping Jai Hanuman to win the league title, and thus promoting to the SVB Hoofdklasse, Alex provided 28 goals, finishing as the league top scorer while helping his side to a 5th-place finish in the league table once promoted to the top flight.

In 2009, he joined Walking Boyz Company, playing in the 2010 CFU Club Championship, making four appearances, against Guyana Defence Force (Guyana), Alpha United (Guyana), Joe Public (Trinidad and Tobago), and System 3 (Saint Vincent and the Grenadines) where his team were eliminated in the second round of the competition.

Honors

Club
SV Jai Hanuman
 SVB Eerste Klasse: 2005–06

Individual
SVB Hoofdklasse Top Goalscorer: 2006–07

References 

Living people
1982 births
Sportspeople from Belém
Brazilian footballers
SVB Eerste Divisie players
S.V. Walking Boyz Company players
Expatriate footballers in Suriname
Brazilian expatriate sportspeople in Suriname
Association football forwards